Eduardo Luís Marques Kruss Gomes (born 6 December 1955), known as Eduardo Luís, is a Portuguese former football central defender and manager.

Club career
Born in Loures, Lisbon District, Eduardo Luís started playing professionally with C.S. Marítimo after unsuccessfully emerging through S.L. Benfica's youth system. He re-signed with the latter for the 1975–76 season, but only appeared in three Primeira Liga games and subsequently returned to the Madeira club, helping it promote from the Segunda Liga at the first attempt and proceeding to only miss a total of two league matches in following four top-flight campaigns.

In 1981, Marítimo were once again in the second division, and Eduardo Luís appeared in all the games for them en route to another promotion. In summer 1982 he joined FC Porto, being regularly used in two of his seven years with the northern side; his best output was in 1986–87 as he made 27 appearances (one goal) for the second-placed team, which also reached the semi-finals of the Taça de Portugal and added that season's European Cup, with the player featuring the full 90 minutes of the 2–1 final win against FC Bayern Munich.

In 1989, aged 33, Eduardo Luís left Porto and signed for Rio Ave F.C. in the second tier. He returned to Portugal following a brief spell in the Canadian National Soccer League with Toronto First Portuguese, moving to division-three club A.D. Ovarense and earning promotion in his first year.

Eduardo Luís started managing one year after retiring. In the following seasons, he was in charge of more than ten teams in the second and third divisions, his biggest achievement being leading C.D. Aves to the fourth position of the former tier in 1995–96 (no promotion though).

International career
Making his debut for Portugal on 24 September 1980 in a 3–1 friendly loss in Italy, Eduardo Luís went on to win eight caps in nearly seven years. He was selected to the squad that appeared at UEFA Euro 1984, being an unused member for the eventual semi-finalists.

References

External links

1955 births
Living people
People from Loures
Sportspeople from Lisbon District
Portuguese footballers
Association football defenders
Primeira Liga players
Liga Portugal 2 players
C.S. Marítimo players
S.L. Benfica footballers
FC Porto players
Rio Ave F.C. players
A.D. Ovarense players
Canadian National Soccer League players
Toronto First Portuguese players
Portugal under-21 international footballers
Portugal international footballers
UEFA Euro 1984 players
Portuguese expatriate footballers
Expatriate soccer players in Canada
Portuguese expatriate sportspeople in Canada
Portuguese football managers
Liga Portugal 2 managers
C.D. Aves managers
F.C. Maia managers
CD Candal managers